Dmitri Yuryevich Ustyuzhaninov (born 7 February 1962 in Nizhny Tagil) is a former Russian football player.

References

1962 births
People from Nizhny Tagil
Living people
Soviet footballers
FC Uralets Nizhny Tagil players
FC Ural Yekaterinburg players
FC Halychyna Drohobych players
Russian footballers
Russian Premier League players
Association football defenders
Sportspeople from Sverdlovsk Oblast